BasisTech is a software company specializing in applying artificial intelligence techniques to understanding documents and unstructured data written in different languages. It has headquarters in Somerville, Massachusetts and offices in San Francisco, Washington, D.C., London, Tel Aviv, and Tokyo. Its legal name is Basis Technology Corp.

The company was founded in 1995 by graduates of the Massachusetts Institute of Technology to use artificial intelligence techniques for natural language processing to help computer systems understand written human language. Its software focuses on analyzing freeform text so that applications can do a better job understanding the meaning of the words. For example, their software can identify tokens, part-of-speech, and lemmas. The tools can also identify different forms of names and phrases. The name of someone, say Albert P. Jones for instance, can appear in many different ways. Some texts will call him "Al Jones", others "Mr. Jones" and others "Albert Paul Jons". 

Their software also performs entity extraction, that is finding words which refer to people, places, and organizations from text for uses such as due diligence, intelligence and metadata tagging.  

The company is best known for its Rosette product which uses Natural Language Processing techniques to improve information retrieval, text mining, search engines and other applications. The tool is used to enable search engines to search in multiple languages,  and match identities and dates.  

BasisTech software is also used by forensic analysts to search through files for words, tokens, phrases or numbers that may be important to investigators, as well as provide software (Cyber Triage) that helps organizations respond to cyberattacks.

Rosette 

Rosette comes as a cloud (public or on-premise) deployment or Java SDK. Rosette provides a variety of natural language processing tools for unstructured text: language identification, base linguistics, entity extraction, name matching, name translation, sentiment analysis, semantic similarity, relationship extraction, topic extraction, categorization, and Arabic chat translation.  It can be integrated into applications to enhance financial compliance onboarding, communication surveillance compliance, social media monitoring, cyber threat intelligence, and customer feedback analysis.

The Rosette Linguistics Platform is composed of these modules:

 Rosette Language Identifier looks at the structural and statistical signature of the file to identify the language. The pre-configured software can recognize 55 different languages with 45 different encodings.
 Rosette Base Linguistics identifies the lemma or word stem after finding the tokens. Search is often faster and more accurate when words are grouped by their stem.
 Rosette Entity Extractor analyzes raw text and identifies the probable role that words and phrases play in the document, a key step that makes it possible for algorithms to distinguish between the various meanings that many words can have. Splitting the raw text into groups of words according to their role and then classifying their contribution to meaning is often called entity analysis. The Basis hybrid approach mixes statistical modeling with rules, regular expressions, and gazetteers, lists of special words that can be tuned to the language and text to be analyzed. The tool is designed to work directly with varied alphabets and multiple languages, an advantage because foreign words are often transliterated in multiple ways. It is believed to be the first commercially available tool for analyzing Arabic text.
 Rosette Name Translator transliterates non-Latin alphabets like Arabic into a consistent Latin form.
 Rosette Name Indexer enables simple search across name variations either by plugging into open source search engines or as a standalone service.
 Rosette Core Library for Unicode smooths the use of Unicode text.
 Rosette Chat Translator for Arabic converts words from the Arabic chat alphabet to Arabic.

Rosette is used in both the United States government offices to support translation and by major Internet infrastructure firms like search engines.

Digital forensics 

BasisTech develops open-source digital forensics tools, The Sleuth Kit and Autopsy, to help identify and extract clues from data storage devices like hard disks or flash cards, as well as devices such as smart phones and iPods. The open-source licensing model allows them to be used as the foundation for larger projects like a Hadoop-based tool for massively parallel forensic analysis of very large data collections.

The digital forensics tool set is used to perform analysis of file systems, new media types, new file types and file system metadata. The tools can search for particular patterns in the files allowing it to target significant files or usage profiles. It can, for instance, look for common files using hash functions and also deconstruct the data structures of the important operating system log files.

The tools are designed to be customizable with an open plugin architecture. Basis Technology helps manage a large and diverse community of developers who use the tool in investigations.

KonaSearch 
BasisTech acquired KonaSearch in June 2019, a startup that specializes in search for Salesforce.com and other office database repositories, which can automate the search step of business workflows.

References

External links
 Official website
 Rosette website
 Cyber Triage website
 Autopsy digital forensics website
 KonaSearch website

Software companies based in Massachusetts
Privately held companies based in Massachusetts
Software companies established in 1995